The Yugoslav regency was a three-member governorship headed by Prince Regent Paul of Yugoslavia in place of Peter II until coming of age. It was in effect between November 1934 and 27 March 1941.

Background

On 9 October 1934 IMRO member Vlado Chernozemski assassinated King Alexander I of Yugoslavia in Marseille in France, and Alexander's cousin Prince Paul took the regency. In his will, Alexander had stipulated that if he died, a council of regents chaired by Paul should govern until Alexander's son Peter II came of age.

Members
Prince Paul of Yugoslavia
Radenko Stanković
Ivo Perović

History
Prince Paul, far more than Alexander, was Yugoslav rather than Serb in outlook (Yugoslavism versus Serbian nationalism). However, unlike Alexander, he inclined much more toward democracy.  In its broadest outline, his domestic policy worked to eliminate the heritage of Alexander's centralism, censorship, and military control and to pacify the country by solving the Serb-Croat problem.

References

Sources

Kingdom of Yugoslavia
Politics of Yugoslavia
Regency (government)